Adan Martin Coronado (born April 20, 1990, in the United States) is an American soccer player.

Career

In 2011, instead of playing college soccer, Coronado paid to take part in a soccer combine, earning a trip to Germany where the players who made the cut would be scouted by German lower-league sides. Subsequently, he signed for Kickers Emden in the German third division, but they were eventually placed in the fifth division due to financial problems.

After playing in the Montenegrin and Bosnian second divisions, Coronado signed for Shuvalan in Azerbaijan, where they filmed him and wanted to know about his culture.

References

External links
 
 NISA profile

Living people
1990 births
American soccer players
Association football midfielders
Association football forwards
Association football wingers
Association football defenders
Illinois Central Cougars men's soccer players
Kickers Emden players
FK Kom players
AZAL PFK players
Oberliga (football) players
California United Strikers FC players
Montenegrin Second League players
First League of the Federation of Bosnia and Herzegovina players
Azerbaijan Premier League players
National Independent Soccer Association players
American expatriate soccer players
American expatriate soccer players in Germany
American expatriate sportspeople in Montenegro
American expatriate sportspeople in Bosnia and Herzegovina
American expatriate sportspeople in Azerbaijan
Expatriate footballers in Montenegro
Expatriate footballers in Bosnia and Herzegovina
Expatriate footballers in Azerbaijan
Soccer players from California